Prakash Shrivastava (born 31 March 1961) is an Indian Judge, serving as the Chief Justice of Calcutta High Court since October 2021.

Career 
He was born on 31 March 1961. He was enrolled as an Advocate on 2 February 1987. He has practised in Civil, Tax and Constitutional sides in Supreme Court of India. He was elevated as an Additional Judge of Madhya Pradesh High Court on 18 January 2008 and took oath as Permanent Judge on 15 January 2010. He was elevated as Chief Justice of Calcutta High Court on 9 October 2021 and took oath on 11 October 2021.

References 

Indian judges
Living people
21st-century Indian judges
1961 births
Chief Justices of the Calcutta High Court
Judges of the Madhya Pradesh High Court
Supreme Court of India lawyers